L. Khengjang is a village in Churachandpur district of Manipur, India.

References

Villages in Churachandpur district